Jamie Lee Hampton (born January 8, 1990) is a former American professional tennis player. In July 2013, she reached her highest singles ranking of world No. 24.

Early life
Hampton was born in Frankfurt, West Germany, because her father, a career US Army officer, was stationed in Germany at the time. Her mother is from South Korea. Soon after, the family moved to the United States. She lived in Enterprise, Alabama, until she was 13; then, she moved to Auburn, Alabama and trained with tennis coach Geoff Waring in Montgomery, Alabama.  Before graduating from Auburn High School in 2008, Hampton twice won the USTA Girls’ 18s doubles title. Hampton turned pro in 2009, playing her first US Open in 2010.

Professional career

2012
After qualifying for the Auckland Open, Hampton fell in the first round to Monica Niculescu. As a qualifier, she advanced to the second round of the Australian Open with a win over Mandy Minella. She was then beaten by the eventual finalist, Maria Sharapova. Next, Hampton played in Memphis International where she beat defending champion Magdaléna Rybáriková in the first round but then fell to Vera Dushevina.

She then received a wildcard into the Indian Wells Open where she made it into the fourth round before having to retire due to cramping against Agnieszka Radwańska, having defeated former champion Jelena Janković in the second round en route. Hampton had to go through qualifying to play in the Miami Open, and then lost in the first round to Polona Hercog, whom she had beaten earlier at Indian Wells. Her next tournament was the Charleston Cup. She beat compatriot Sloane Stephens but then lost to US Open champion Samantha Stosur in the second round.

While struggling with back injuries during the clay court season, Hampton lost in qualifying at the Italian Open and Internationaux de Strasbourg. She was forced to retire in the first round of the French Open against Arantxa Rus due to an injury. After withdrawing from the Aegon Classic, Hampton upset 27th seed Daniela Hantuchová in the first round of Wimbledon. In the second round, she lost to Heather Watson.

Next up for Hampton was the US Open, where she lost in the first round to Marion Bartoli. Her next tournament was the Korea Open where she went through qualifying. She then advanced to the second round but was beaten by Ekaterina Makarova. The next week, Hampton played in the Pan Pacific Open. After advancing to the third round with wins over Caroline Garcia and Kaia Kanepi, she fell short to Agnieszka Radwańska.

Her last tournament of the year was the Osaka Open in Japan. She defeated Ayumi Morita and Tamarine Tanasugarn to get to the quarterfinals where she lost to top seed Samantha Stosur. With her best year on tour to date, Hampton ended the year ranked 71 in singles.

2013
Hampton started off 2013 by playing in Auckland. In the first round, she defeated defending champion and fourth seed, Zheng Jie. In the next round, Hampton beat Marina Erakovic to get a place in the quarterfinals. She defeated Kiki Bertens in the quarterfinals. Hampton lost a tight two-set semifinal with two tiebreaks to the 2012 Wimbledon runner-up and world No. 4, Agnieszka Radwańska.

Her next tournament was the Australian Open. In the first round, she upset 31st seed Urszula Radwańska. Hampton then crushed qualifier Luksika Kumkhum, 6–2, 6–1. In the third round, she faced defending champion Victoria Azarenka. The match lasted over two hours before Azarenka prevailed in three sets. Hampton suffered a lower-back injury late in the second set.

At the Brussels Open, Hampton defeated Roberta Vinci to reach the semifinals, but lost in straight sets to Kaia Kanepi.

At the French Open, Hampton defeated 25th seed Lucie Šafářová in the first round in a tough three-set match and flew by Anna Karolína Schmiedlová in the second round. She defeated seventh seed Petra Kvitová in the third in straight sets before she lost to Jelena Janković in the fourth round.

After qualifying for the Eastbourne International, Hampton upset top seed and world No. 4, Agnieszka Radwańska, in straight sets in the first round, and then went on to beat Caroline Wozniacki in the semifinals to reach her first WTA tournament final. She lost in the final to Elena Vesnina in straight sets.

In June, she lost to Sloane Stephens in the first round of Wimbledon.

Hampton reached the semifinals of the Stanford Classic in California, where she was seeded fourth. With this result, she reached a career-high ranking of No. 24.

At the US Open, where Hampton was seeded at a Major for the first time, she reached the third round, but was again defeated by Sloane Stephens.

2014
Hampton had a strong start to her 2014 season, advancing to the semifinals in Auckland, when she was forced to withdraw due to a hip injury against Venus Williams.

She subsequently withdrew from the Australian Open, and then underwent six surgeries over the next 18 months. She has not returned to the tour since.

2020: Retirement
In May 2020, six years after playing her last match on tour, Hampton announced on Twitter that she was retiring from the tour due to nagging injuries.

Grand Slam performance timelines

WTA career finals

Singles: 1 (runner-up)

Doubles: 1 (runner-up)

ITF Circuit finals

Singles: 12 (5–7)

Doubles: 9 (5–4)

References

External links

 
 

1990 births
Living people
American female tennis players
Auburn High School (Alabama) alumni
Sportspeople from Auburn, Alabama
American sportspeople of Korean descent
American people of South Korean descent
Tennis people from Alabama
21st-century American women